John Collin William Allister (15 March 1919 – 22 March 1946), known as "Jack", and as "Tich", was an Australian rules footballer who played for North Melbourne in the Victorian Football League (VFL).

Family
The son of James Allister, and Henrietta Leonora Allister (1894–1953), née Wills, John Collin William Allister was born on 15 March 1919 in Ascot Vale, Victoria.

Football

Esendon (VFL)
Allister started his career in 1938 with Essendon but managed just one game.

Sandringham (VFA)
In 1939 and 1940 he played with Sandringham in  the VFA.

North Melbourne (VFA)
He returned to the VFL in 1941 and joined North Melbourne, playing 58 games for the club over his five seasons. His best year came in 1942 when he kicked 29 goals and was North Melbourne's best and fairest.

Death
He died of pneumonia on 22 March 1946.

References

External links
 
 The VFA Project: Allister, Jack "Tich".
 Jack Allister, australianfootball.com.

1919 births
Australian rules footballers from Melbourne
Essendon Football Club players
North Melbourne Football Club players
Syd Barker Medal winners
Deaths from pneumonia in Victoria (Australia)
1946 deaths
People from Ascot Vale, Victoria